The Order of Hamilton is the most prestigious municipal order awarded to residents of the city of Hamilton. Instituted in 2019, the order is administered by the incumbent mayor of Hamilton for "significant volunteer achievements" in service to the city or communities therein.

History 
The order was announced on April 10, 2019, by mayor Fred Eisenberger, and the first orders were awarded on January 5, 2020, at the Mayor's New Year's Levee. The city created the order as a way to award "[t]he unsung heroes of our communities [who] are the endless volunteers".

Similar awards from other cities in Ontario include the Order of Vaughan, and the Order of Ottawa, and the Order of Montreal is awarded in the Province of Quebec.

Recipients 
Recipients are awarded the order annually at the Mayor's New Year's Levee.

2019
 Kathy Cooper
 Dave Glover
 Kenneth Hall
 Dr. Joan Heels
 Nancy Hewer
 Latisha Laing
 Nina Maljar
 Robin McKee
 Evelyn Myrie
 Dr. Anne Pearson

2020
 Rabia Saleem Awan
 Jim Cimba
 Dr. Margaret Denton
 Brenda Duke
 Mary Elop
 Anthony Frisina
 George Geczy
 Dr. Nadia Eva Rosa
 Raven Van Bommel
 Robert J. Wilkins

2021
 Randy and Susan Bassett
 Margaret Bennett
 Zaigham Shafiq Butt
 Ward Campbell
 Dr. Zobia Jawed
 Alex Moroz
 Nicholas Scime
 Edmund Shaker
 Mark Wu
 Rob Young

2022
 Bill Custers
 Mike Moore
 Karen Nelson
 Steven Zizzo

See also 
 Order of Montreal

References 

Ontario awards
Awards established in 2019
2019 establishments in Ontario
Culture of Hamilton, Ontario